Johan Trondsen (26 July 1922 – 4 March 2018) was a Norwegian politician for the Liberal Party and the Liberal People's Party.

He served as a deputy representative to the Parliament of Norway from Telemark during the term 1961–1965. In total he met during 10 days of parliamentary session. In 1973 he stood for election for the Liberal People's Party, as second candidate behind Sigurd Kalheim.

He was a bailiff in Nissedal. From 1985 to 1992 he was a board member of the Norwegian Police Academy.

References

1922 births
2018 deaths
People from Nissedal
Deputy members of the Storting
Liberal Party (Norway) politicians
Liberal People's Party (Norway, 1972) politicians
20th-century Norwegian politicians
Politicians from Telemark
Norwegian police officers